In Inuit mythology, Arnakuagsak ("old woman from the sea". Alternative: Arnarquagsag, Arnakua'gsak) was an Inuit goddess, one of the primary deities of the religion, who was responsible for ensuring the hunters were able to catch enough food and that the people remained healthy and strong.  She was worshipped primarily in Greenland, but was essentially equivalent to the Canadian Sedna or Arnapkapfaaluk and the Alaskan Nerrivik.

References

Inuit mythology
Inuit goddesses
Sea and river goddesses
Hunting goddesses
Greenlandic culture